The 1969 Taça de Portugal Final was the final match of the 1968–69 Taça de Portugal, the 29th season of the Taça de Portugal, the premier Portuguese football cup competition organized by the Portuguese Football Federation (FPF). The match was played on 22 June 1969 at the Estádio Nacional in Oeiras, and opposed two Primeira Liga sides: Académica and Benfica. Benfica defeated Académica 2–1 to claim a thirteenth Taça de Portugal.

Match

Details

References

1969
Taca
Associação Académica de Coimbra – O.A.F. matches
S.L. Benfica matches